Khomutovo is an urban locality (an urban-type settlement) in Novoderevenkovsky District of Oryol Oblast, Russia. Population:

References

Urban-type settlements in Oryol Oblast